The C-NCAP is a Chinese car safety assessment program. It is primarily modeled after safety standards established by Euro NCAP and is run by the China Automotive Technology and Research Center.

References

New Car Assessment Programs
Consumer organizations in China